Macduff Lifeboat Station is a Royal National Lifeboat Institution (RNLI) marine-rescue facility in Macduff, Aberdeenshire, Scotland, United Kingdom. The current lifeboat station in Macduff became operational in March 1974 when the Mk1 Barnett Class lifeboat The James and Margaret Boyd was stationed there for a trial period of one year. In March 1975 the Committee of Management agreed that a permanent station should be established.

The lifeboat station in this part of Aberdeenshire has been located in various locations in Banff & Macduff and between 1923 and 1969 the station was located in Whitehills, three miles to the west of Macduff. Supporters and volunteers treat the station as 'one' regardless of the locations over the years. 

The station is currently equipped with an  lifeboat, B-804 the Lydia Macdonald. The launch & recovery system at Macduff is unique within the RNLI, being the only one where the boat is stored, lanched and recovered from a mobile davit, that is an HGV with crane.

History 

The idea for a station at Macduff was first brought forward at a RNLI Committee Meeting held in Banff on 1 December 1859. The decision to proceed was taken the following March, and the station became operational in August 1860. The first station was built at Banff Harbour and is noted as being a substantial granite building, about 40 feet long, and 18 feet wide within the walls, and which cost about £140.

In July 1866 at a meeting of the Local Committee of the Royal National Life Boat Association, it was unanimously agreed that the lifeboat station be moved from Banff Harbour to Palmer Cove on the East side of Banff Bay.

In 1877 the lifeboat station was relocated again, to a building at the east side of Banff Bridge. This building still stands and is now a house and business premises. On the seaward gable end you can clearly see three stones carved with RN - 1877 - LBI. 

In 1902, the station was renamed 'Banff & Macduff' it kept this name until 1923 when it was relocated to Whitehills. In 1924 the name of the station was changed to Whitehills, to reflect the new location.

The move from Macduff to Whitehills was made because over the years, the fishermen of Banff & Macduff, were fishing further away and were not available to crew the lifeboat if required. The fishermen in Whitehills however, fished a lot closer to home, making them more available to crew the lifeboat.

Station Locations & Names

Inshore lifeboats

All Weather Boats

References

External links
Macduff Lifeboat Station
Macduff Lifeboat Facebook Page.

Lifeboat stations in Scotland
Macduff, Aberdeenshire